Gadhimai may refer to:

 Gadhimai, Rautahat, a municipality in Rautahat district, Nepal
 Gadhimai, Bara, former municipality and currently a part of Jitpur Simara Sub-metropolitan city, Bara District, Nepal
 Gadhimai Temple 
 Gadhimai festival